The Danish Court Administration is the national council of the judiciary of Denmark. It is an independent institution responsible for the management and development of the Danish court system and Appeals Permission Board.

See also
 Courts of Denmark

References

External links
 Official website

Government agencies of Denmark
1999 establishments in Denmark
Judiciary of Denmark
National councils of the judiciary
Government agencies established in 1999